Ara Sargsyan (1902 - 1969) was an Armenian sculptor, People's Artist of the USSR (1963), academic of the Russian Academy of Arts.

Biography
Sargsyan was born in the Armenian village of Makri, near Constantinople. He finished the local Armenian school, then Constantinople Art School and studied under the famed Ottoman Armenian sculptor Yervant Voskan. He moved to Athens, Greece in 1920 and further to Rome and Vienna where he studied sculpture till 1925. Sargsyan excelled at Vienna School of Masters.

In 1925 Ara Sargsyan moved to Soviet Armenia.

Legacy
Most recognizable works of Ara Sargsyan are the monuments of Mother Armenia in Gyumri, Hovhannes Tumanyan and Alexander Spendiarian statues in front of Yerevan Opera house, and the statues of Mesrop Mashtots and Sahak Partev in front of Yerevan State University.

Ara Sargsyan was a prolific teacher and influenced numerous artists, e.g. Rafik Khachatryan (1937-1993).

Sargsyan's house in Yerevan has been converted into a Museum where most of his works are presented.

Exhibitions 

 City Art Exhibition of the House of Armenian Culture, Constantinople, 1921
 Participated in the exhibition of Viennese artists for the first time with portraits of musicologist R. Robert and pianist V. Simonovic, and was highly praised by the press, 1922
 Spring Exhibition of the Society of Artists in Vienna, 1923
 For the first time participated in the exhibition of Armenian artists in Armenia, 1926
 The USSR People's Art Jubilee Exhibition in Moscow, 1927
 The exhibition of engravings and drawings of ARSU (Association of Revolutionary Art of Ukraine). Kiev, 1928
 Participated in "10 Years" Fine Arts Exhibition in Yerevan, 1930
 11th Anniversary of Armenia's Fine Arts Exhibition in Yerevan, 1931
 Exhibition "15 Years of the Red Army". Yerevan, 1933
 Exhibition "Activities of Artists and Сculptors of Armenia for 13 Years" Yerevan, 1933
 Exhibition "Fine Arts of Transcaucasia". 1st Transcaucasian Olympiad of Art. Tbilisi, 1934
 Chairman of the Central Executive Committee of the Arm SSR awarded him the title of "Honored Artist" for his services in the field of fine arts, 1935
 He is elected a member of the Transcaucasian Central Executive Committee, 1935
 Exhibition "15 Years of Fine Art". Yerevan, 1935
 Exhibition "The Soviet Constitution." Yerevan, 1937
 World Exhibition. New York, 1938
 The Supreme Soviet of the USSR awarded him the medal "Order of Honor" for outstanding achievements in the field of fine arts, 1939
 Exhibition of Fine Arts of the Armenian SSR. Moscow-Leningrad, 1939
 Mobile exhibition of works of artists and sculptors of the Armenian SSR. Armenia, 1939
 Anniversary exhibition of fine arts of Armenia for 20 years. Yerevan, 1940
 Exhibition of Fine Arts of Armenia for 20 years. Tbilisi, 1941
 Exhibition "Artists of Armenia in the Great Patriotic War". Yerevan, 1942
 "Hero of the Red Army" exhibition. Yerevan, 1942
 Jubilee exhibition "The Great Patriotic War", dedicated to the 25th anniversary of the establishment of Soviet power in Armenia, 1942
 Exhibition "For the Motherland". Yerevan, 1943
 Exhibition of works of artists of Armenia. Moscow, 1944
 Awarded the Order of Honor of the second degree of the Supreme Soviet of the USSR, 1945
 Exhibition of Fine Arts of Armenia. Yerevan, 1945
 Anniversary exhibition dedicated to the 25th anniversary of the establishment of Soviet power in Armenia. Yerevan, 1945
 Exhibition of Fine Arts of the Armenian SSR, Moscow, 1946
 Receives the title of Professor of Sculpture, 1947
 Elected deputy of the Supreme Soviet of the USSR, 1947
 All-Union Art Exhibition. Moscow, 1947 
 The jubilee exhibition of works of artists of Armenia, dedicated to the 30th anniversary of the Great October Socialist Revolution. Yerevan, 1947
 Exhibition of works of artists of Armenia, dedicated to the 14th Congress of the Communist Party of Armenia. Yerevan, 1948
 Exhibition of Soviet art in Armenia, dedicated to the 30th anniversary of the Soviet Army. Yerevan, 1948
 Elected Corresponding Member of the Academy of Arts of the USSR, 1949
 Presidium of the Supreme Council of the Armenian SSR assigns him the title of People's Artist of Armenia, 1950
 The exhibition of fine arts of Armenia, dedicated to the XXX anniversary of the establishment of Soviet power in Armenia. Yerevan All-Union Art Exhibition. Moscow, 1950
 Elected to the Presidium of the Supreme Council of Armenia. SSR, 1951
 Art exhibition. Yerevan, 1952
 Exhibition of works of members of the Academy of Arts of the USSR. Moscow, 1952
 The third exhibition of works of full members and corresponding members of the Academy of Arts of the USSR. Moscow, 1954
 Exhibition of Fine Arts of the Armenian SSR. Moscow, 1956
 Exhibition of paintings and graphics of the First All-Union Congress of Soviet Artists. Moscow, 1957
 All-Union Art Exhibition dedicated to the Great October Socialist Revolution. (1917-1957). Moscow, 1957
 Exhibition of Fine Arts of the Armenian SSR, dedicated to the 40th anniversary of the Great October Socialist Revolution. Yerevan, 1957
 Exhibition of works of full members and corresponding members of the Academy of Arts of the USSR. Moscow, 1957
 Selected as a full member of the Academy of Arts of the USSR, 1958	
 Exhibition of works of fine art of the socialist countries. Moscow-Leningrad, 1958
 "Our contemporary". Exhibition of works of full members, honorary members անդ corresponding members of the Academy of Arts of the USSR, Moscow, 1959
 Republican art exhibition dedicated to the 40th anniversary of the establishment of Soviet power in Armenia. Yerevan, 1960
 All-Union Art Exhibition. Moscow, 1961
 For the first time in Yerevan and Moscow exhibition of 40 years of creative activity with demonstration of about 400 works is organized, 1962
 Аwarded the title of People's Artist of the USSR by the Decree of the Supreme Soviet of the USSR of April 12, 1963
 On April 16, a solo exhibition of his work in the halls of the USSR Academy of Arts was held in Moscow, 1963
 Participates in the exhibition of Painters' Union in Yerevan with his monumental memorial "Mother Armenia", 1968
 Posthumously awarded the title of laureate of the USSR State Prize, 1971
 Monumental memorial "Mother Armenia" is exhibited in the "Soviet Pavilion" of the international exhibition "Expo 74" in Spokane, USA, 1974
 The monumental memorial "Mother Armenia" is exhibited in the "Pavilion of Armenia" at the international exhibition in Buenos Aires, 1976

References

External links
 
  Biography
 http://slovari.yandex.ru/%D0%B0%D1%80%D0%B0%20%D1%81%D0%B0%D1%80%D0%BA%D1%81%D1%8F%D0%BD/%D0%91%D0%A1%D0%AD/%D0%A1%D0%B0%D1%80%D0%BA%D1%81%D1%8F%D0%BD%20%D0%90%D1%80%D0%B0%20%D0%9C%D0%B8%D0%B3%D1%80%D0%B0%D0%BD%D0%BE%D0%B2%D0%B8%D1%87/

1902 births
1969 deaths
Armenian sculptors
Armenians from the Ottoman Empire
20th-century sculptors